van Ryneveld is an Afrikaans surname. Notable people with the surname include:

Clive van Ryneveld (1928–2018), South African cricketer
Pierre van Ryneveld (1891–1972), South African World War I flying ace, Royal Air Force officer, and South African Air Force general

Afrikaans-language surnames
Surnames of Dutch origin